The Korean mackerel (Scomberomorus koreanus) also known as the Korean seerfish, is a ray-finned bony fish in the family Scombridae, better known as the mackerel family.  More specifically, this fish is a member of the tribe Scomberomorini, the Spanish mackerels. It has an Indo-Pacific distribution which extends from the east coast of India and Sri Lanka along the Asian continental shelf to Sumatra then north to Korea and Wakasa Bay in the Sea of Japan. This species is of minor commercial importance in some parts of its range where it is taken using gill nets and is marketed either fresh or dried-salted. The Korean mackerel is an important quarry species for the drift net fishery in Palk Bay and the Gulf of Mannar in India.

References

Korean mackerel
Fish of Korea
Taxa named by Kamakichi Kishinouye
Korean mackerel